BD Bacatá (abbreviation for Bogotá Downtown Bacatá) is an architectural complex currently under construction in Bogotá, Colombia, featuring the tallest building in the country, surpassing the Torre Colpatria, and the sixth tallest in South America. Development includes office and retail space, apartments and a 364-room hotel, replacing the former Hotel Bacatá that was constructed in the same location. It will be the tallest skyscraper in Colombia, and the first crowdfunded skyscraper, meaning that it was funded by private individuals through the purchase of shares and fiduciary rights allowed under Colombian law.

Financial problems of the constructing company and Spanish real estate promoter Venerando Lamelas in 2018 have postponed the completion of the complex. A total of 133 billion COP $ in debt has been registered.

Name origin 
The complex was named after an old hotel which used to be in the construction site, but was sold to the Spanish design firm, Alonso Balaguer. The old hotel was demolished; however, its name will remain, as it acknowledges Bogotá's (and Colombia's) indigenous heritage.

Design 
The BD Bacatá complex has the two tallest buildings in Colombia, one with 67 stories, where the new hotel, owned by the Spanish firm Eurostars, will be operating; and the other with 56 stories. The main materials used in the construction of the skyscraper are glass, aluminium and concrete. Both buildings will be connected by a pedestrian footpath in the first floor through the mall's platform, shared by both of them, and it will also have two pedestrian bridges, located in the 14 and 25 floors of both towers.

In the south tower, where the hotel will be located, the predominant material will be glass, notable in the curtain wall planned for it. The office section, located in the north tower, will also have a glass facade and the apartments section will have windows from floor to ceiling, and balconies.

Crowdfunding 
BD Bacatá is the world's first crowdfunded skyscraper. It is the first skyscraper to be built in Colombia in 35 years. The structure is financed by over 3,800 ordinary Colombians.

Gallery

References

External links 

  BD Bacatá Official website

Skyscraper office buildings in Colombia
Buildings and structures in Bogotá
Bacata
Crowdfunding projects
Skyscrapers in Colombia
Skyscraper hotels
Residential skyscrapers
Retail buildings in Colombia